The 1968 Iowa gubernatorial election was held on November 5, 1968. Republican nominee Robert D. Ray defeated Democratic nominee Paul Franzenburg with 54.06% of the vote.

Primary elections
Primary elections were held on September 3, 1968.

Democratic primary

Candidates
Paul Franzenburg, Treasurer of Iowa

Results

Republican primary

Candidates
Robert D. Ray, former Chair of the Iowa Republican Party
Donald E. Johnson, former Commander of the American Legion
Robert K. Beck, former State Representative

Results

General election

Candidates
Major party candidates
Robert D. Ray, Republican
Paul Franzenburg, Democratic 

Other candidates
Harry Miller, Prohibition

Results

References

1968
Iowa
Gubernatorial
November 1968 events in the United States